Goodbye Swingtime is the first studio album by The Matthew Herbert Big Band. It was released on Accidental Records in 2003.

Critical reception
Mark Richardson of Pitchfork gave the album a 7.6 out of 10, calling it "a highly original and engaging record that's also one of the last things one would expect for a producer who made his name with house music." Marshall Bowden of PopMatters said, "Goodbye Swingtime is both interesting and innovative, but somehow it just doesn't allow the listener to connect emotionally with either the big band side or the electronic side of the project."

Track listing

Charts

References

External links
 

2003 debut albums
Matthew Herbert albums